"Being Alive" is a song from the musical Company by George Furth with music and lyrics by Stephen Sondheim. The song appears at the end of act two and is sung by the main character, Robert, a 35-year-old bachelor who at the show's end "...realizes being a lone wolf isn't all it's cracked up to be ... he declares that he wants to take the chance, be afraid, get his heart broken - or whatever happens when you decide to love and be loved."

Context

"Being Alive" appears at the end of Act II of the musical Company by George Furth with music and lyrics by Stephen Sondheim. The song is sung by the main character, Robert (Bobby), who is facing his 35th birthday and the prospect of living the rest of his life alone. Prior to singing "Being Alive", Robert reflects on the relationships of five couples, his "...good and crazy married friends—Susan and Peter, Sarah and Harry, Amy and Paul, Jenny and David, and Joanne and Larry..." along with the relationships he has with three of his "girlfriends—April, Kathy, and Marta..."  While each relationship has its problems, Robert concludes that life is better lived with someone rather than alone.

Background
"Being Alive" was only used after three previous closing numbers had been tried. The first of these attempts was with a song entitled "Multitudes of Amys", but as Sondheim describes, Furth "transferred the situation in which it was to be sung – Robert's proposal to Amy – to Act One and the song had to be replaced". The second attempt was "Marry Me A Little." Sondheim commented that on this try he knew halfway through the writing process that it would not work for the character, and the only reason he finished the song was as "a favor for a friend who loved it." The third attempt came with "Happily Ever After," which even made it to the Boston tryout before it was "deemed too dark to serve as a closing number." Hence, Sondheim's fourth and final attempt was made with "Being Alive", in which he tried to express the same thoughts as "Happily Ever After", but in a more optimistic way.  

Sondheim was initially reluctant to write a closing song with a more positive tone, and made efforts to write a composition that would combine cynical and hopeful sentiments. He wrote in his 2009 memoir Finishing the Hat that he worried a plainly optimistic approach would be "unearned and pandering, not to mention monotonous, since there would be only one thing to say: namely, marriage is wonderful". His concerns were resolved when "Michael Bennett came up with the idea of using the same technique of interlaced spoken voices from Robert's friends that we used in 'Side by Side by Side,' helping him break through his moment of crisis. That suggested to me a song which could progress from complaint to prayer. Thus, 'Being Alive.'"

Performances (on stage, in concert, recorded or otherwise)

"Being Alive" was first recorded by Dean Jones, who originated the role of Robert on Broadway in 1970. Jones's tenure playing the part was short lived, and a recording of his replacement Larry Kert performing "Being Alive" has been included as a bonus track on subsequent re-releases of the original cast album.

"Being Alive" has become popular outside its original musical setting, and although written for a male part is frequently performed by women. The song has been performed in concert, on the stage, or in the studio by Bernadette Peters, Patti LuPone, Barbra Streisand, Dusty Springfield, Margaret Whiting, Lea Salonga, Ute Lemper, and Lauren Samuels, among others. Raul Esparza was a nominee at the 2007 Tony Awards for his role in Company and performed the song on the awards show. The character Kurt Hummel, played by actor Chris Colfer, covered the song during the ninth episode, "Swan Song", of the fourth season of the television show Glee, as his audition for the fictional school NYADA. In the British soap opera EastEnders, the song is Linda Carter's (Kellie Bright) wedding song when she marries Mick Carter (Danny Dyer) on New Year's Day 2016, and is performed by West End star Alice Fearn. The song also appears on her album "Where I've Been... Where I'm Going". The song was also sung, and played on the piano by Alex (Judd Hirsch) in the US sitcom Taxi, season 2, episode 21, "Alex Jumps Out of a Plane".

The American composer Gabriel Kahane wrote a piano scherzo, "Being Alive", for Liaisons: Re-Imagining Sondheim from the Piano which was inspired by the Sondheim song.

In the 2019 film Marriage Story, written and directed by Noah Baumbach, lead character Charlie Barber (portrayed by Adam Driver) performs much of the song in a New York piano bar.

References

Songs from musicals
Songs written by Stephen Sondheim
1970 songs
Songs about marriage